Rhabdiopteryx is a genus of winter stoneflies in the family Taeniopterygidae. There are about 11 described species in Rhabdiopteryx.

Species
These 11 species belong to the genus Rhabdiopteryx:
 Rhabdiopteryx acuminata Klapálek, 1905
 Rhabdiopteryx alpina Kühtreiber, 1934
 Rhabdiopteryx antoninoi Vinçon & Ravizza, 1999
 Rhabdiopteryx christinae Theischinger, 1975
 Rhabdiopteryx doieranensis Ikonomov, 1983
 Rhabdiopteryx hamulata (Klapálek, 1902)
 Rhabdiopteryx harperi Vinçon & Murányi, 2009
 Rhabdiopteryx navicula Theischinger, 1974
 Rhabdiopteryx neglecta (Albarda, 1889)
 Rhabdiopteryx thienemanni Illies, 1957
 Rhabdiopteryx triangularis Braasch & Joost, 1972

References

Further reading

 
 

Taeniopterygidae